Caitlin Bilodeaux (born March 17, 1965) is an American fencer. She competed in the women's individual and team foil events at the 1988 and 1992 Summer Olympics. She is married to Jean-Marie Banos, who represented Canada at the Olympics in fencing.

She fenced for the Columbia Lions fencing team.  She graduated from Columbia University in 1987, and was the first woman fencer to win multiple NCAA titles. In her freshman bio, she was described as "one of the most significant athletes ever to enter Columbia."

References

External links
 

1965 births
Living people
American female sabre fencers
Olympic fencers of the United States
Fencers at the 1988 Summer Olympics
Fencers at the 1992 Summer Olympics
Sportspeople from Boston
Pan American Games medalists in fencing
Pan American Games gold medalists for the United States
Pan American Games bronze medalists for the United States
Fencers at the 1987 Pan American Games
Columbia Lions fencers
Medalists at the 1987 Pan American Games
21st-century American women